The McCook YMCA is a historic building in McCook, Nebraska. It was built in 1925 by Swanson & Sudik for the YMCA, and designed in the Mission Revival style by architect William N. Bowman. It housed McCook Junior College from 1926 to 1936. Groups like the American Red Cross and the Church of Jesus Christ of Latter-day Saints held meetings here. It has been listed on the National Register of Historic Places since March 9, 2000.

References

National Register of Historic Places in Red Willow County, Nebraska
Mission Revival architecture in Nebraska
Buildings and structures completed in 1925
YMCA buildings in the United States